María Dolores Campana (born 5 April 1975) is an Ecuadorian former professional tennis player.

Biography
Born in Quito, Campana competed on the professional tour in the 1990s and reached a best singles ranking of 287 in the world. She made her only WTA Tour main draw appearance at the 1995 Zagreb Open, where she featured in the doubles.

During her career she was a regular member of the Ecuador Fed Cup team and is the country's most successful Fed Cup player, with 28 overall wins, 20 of which came in singles.

Campana now lives in Guayaquil and has two daughters. Her elder brother is Ecuadorian politician Pablo Campana, who was also a tennis player.

ITF finals

Singles: 8 (4–4)

Doubles: 18 (8–10)

References

External links
 
 
 

1975 births
Living people
Ecuadorian female tennis players
Sportspeople from Quito
20th-century Ecuadorian women